Mandi (English: Market Place) is a 1983 Hindi-language film directed by Shyam Benegal. Based on a classic Urdu short story Aanandi by writer Ghulam Abbas, the film narrates the story of a brothel, situated in the heart of a city, an area that some politicians want for its prime locality. The film is a satirical comedy on politics and prostitution, and stars Shabana Azmi, Smita Patil and Naseeruddin Shah among others.

The film won the 1984 National Film Award for Best Art Direction for Nitish Roy. It was selected at Indian Panorama at Filmostav, Bombay 1984, and was invited to the Los Angeles Exposition (FILMEX), the Hong Kong International Film Festival 1984, and London Film Festival 1983.

Mandi is the Hindi Film with the highest number of Filmfare Award winners (12) in the cast (Smita Patil, Shabana Azmi, Neena Gupta, Naseeruddin Shah, Om Puri, Saeed Jaffrey, Annu Kapoor, Satish Kaushik, Pankaj Kapur, Amrish Puri, Ila Arun and K. K. Raina). Additionally the film includes (4) Filmfare nominees in the cast (Kulbhushan Kharbanda, Anita Kanwar, Ratna Pathak Shah and Soni Razdan).

Plot
For years, an aging Rukmini Bai (Shabana Azmi) has been the Madame of a brothel in Hyderabad, India. The women in the brothel live in harmony. Rukmini Bai takes pride in the talent of her women, especially Zeenat (Smita Patil) who is a classical singer and Basanti (Neena Gupta) who is a classical dancer. Rukmini Bai is quite possessive about Zeenat and does not let her get engaged in prostitution. She is protective of her from the customers who wish to deflower Zeenat. One day Rukmini Bai gets the news, that she, now, has a new landlord Mr. Gupta (Kulbhushan Kharbanda), whose daughter Malti (Ratna Pathak) is to marry Mr. Aggarwal's (Saeed Jaffrey) son, Sushil, shortly. Given the finesse of Zeenat and Basanti, Mr. Gupta invites Rukmini Bai with her women to perform at the engagement ceremony of his daughter. During the performance, Sushil is smitten by Zeenat's beauty and approaches her in the dressing room. Zeenat also gets attracted to Sushil. In the meanwhile, it is shown that the City Councillor, Shantidevi (Gita Siddharth), who also runs the Women Organisation of the town is averse to Rukmini Bai and her doings. In a Municipal Committee meeting, she proposes that the brothel should be moved out of town, in order to protect the town from getting corrupted. The committee agrees to her demands and Rukmini Bai and her women are forced to relocate to a new place in the outskirts of the city,  which happens to be near the Dargah of Baba Karak Shah. This attracts a lot of people, and Rukmini Bai's brothel starts thriving.

In the meanwhile, Rukmini Bai gets to know about the budding love between Zeenat and Sushil and she forbids Zeenat from going ahead with the relationship. She reveals that Zeenat is the illegitimate child of Mr. Aggarwal and another prostitute, and Rukmini Bai had kept it as a secret for years, in order to save the face of Mr. Aggarwal. It makes Zeenat and Sushil siblings and renders their romantic relationship prohibited. The complications set in when Sushil refuses to marry Malti and runs away from his house in order to pursue Zeenat. He asks Zeenat to elope from the brothel with him in search of better existence and Zeenat accepts his proposal. The whole brothel is in a state of panic when the news of Zeenat's elopement breaks out. Rukmini Bai and Aggarwal go in search of the children. However, during the way, Zeenat is overcome by guilt as she is aware of their biological relationship and thus, runs away from Sushil as well. Sushil is heartbroken. Rukmini Bai too is unable to come to terms with the news of Zeenat's disappearance. She is sobbing in her brothel and instead of getting sympathy, she is rebuked by Nadira (Soni Razdan), a prostitute who works for her. She asks Rukmini Bai to exit the brothel as the women do not need her anymore and can run the brothel on their own. Rukmini Bai is in a state of shock and with a heavy heart, she quits the brothel with her faithful helper Tungrus (Naseeruddin Shah). On their way, due to exhaustion, they halt for water. While looking for water, Tungrus accidentally comes across a Shiv Lingam. He calls out to Rukmini Bai and they both pray to the Shivlingam for a better future. Just then, they see Phoolmani (Sreela Majumdar), a former brothel woman, running towards them. Rukmini Bai is delighted at the sight of Phoolmani and thanks the almighty.

Cast

Smita Patil as Zeenat
Shabana Azmi as Rukmini Bai
Neena Gupta as Basanti
Kulbhushan Kharbanda as Mr. Gupta
Naseeruddin Shah as Tungrus
Soni Razdan as Nadira
Om Puri as Ramgopal
K. K. Raina as Shrikant
Saeed Jaffrey as Mayor Aggarwal
Annu Kapoor as The Doctor
Aditya Bhattacharya as Sushil
Anita Kanwar as Parweena
Sreela Majumdar as Phoolmani
Satish Kaushik as Councillor
Gita Siddharth as Shantidevi
Pankaj Kapur as Shantidevi's assistant
Harish Patel as Policeman
Ratna Pathak Shah as Malti
Amrish Puri as Darvish
Ila Arun as Kamli

Soundtrack
The lyrics of the film by Mir Taqi Mir, Bahadur Shah Zafar, Insha, Makhdoom Mohiuddin and Sarwar Danda and music is by Vanraj Bhatia.

Awards and nominations

References

External links
 
 1982: On the sets of Mandi Screen (magazine)

1983 films
1983 comedy-drama films
1980s Hindi-language films
Indian satirical films
Films based on short fiction
Films about prostitution in India
Films set in Hyderabad, India
Films directed by Shyam Benegal
Films scored by Vanraj Bhatia
Films whose production designer won the Best Production Design National Film Award
1983 comedy films
1983 drama films
Films with screenplays by Shama Zaidi